Impala is a diversified company in energy, manufacturing, brands and asset management. In 2013, total group invested over €300 million. Group companies employ approximately 6,000 people. Impala SAS was founded by Jacques Veyrat after stepping down as CEO of the global conglomerate Louis Dreyfus.

Activity 
Impala builds controlling interests in projects with high international growth potential operating in four industries: energy, manufacturing, brands and asset management.

Main Investments 
 Direct Énergie : 3rd largest electricity and natural gas supplier on the French market
 Neoen : Power producer from renewable energy sources 
 Castleton Commodities International : Established global commodities merchant
 Eiffel Investment Group : Alternative asset investor 
 CPI : Largest manufacturer of monochrome books in Europe
 Technoplus Industries : Manufacturer of critical mechanical components
 Electropoli : European leader in surface finishing on metal substrates
 Clestra : Manufacturer and installer of office partitions
 Pull-in : Underwear and swimwear brand

Governance 
The group's chairman is Jacques Veyrat, the CEO is Fabrice Dumonteil.

External links 
 Official website

Notes and references 

Holding companies of France
Companies based in Paris
2011 establishments in France